Bobby-Man Brant Panag (July 21, 1952 – August 8, 1983) was a Canadian boxer from Brantford, Ontario. He found great success on the "Red Circuit" - boxing matches held on Indian Reserves throughout North America, at one time knocking out Marvin Camel at a fight in Northern Montana Many Native American fighters traveled on the "Red Circuit", in lieu of discriminatory practices in mainstream professional sports at the time which promoted ethnic stereotypes. Bobby-Man is also significant for starting the first boxing club on the Six Nations reserve, which operated until his death in 1983.

References 

1952 births
1983 deaths
Boxing people from Ontario
Canadian male boxers
Canadian Mohawk people
First Nations sportspeople
Sportspeople from Brantford
20th-century First Nations people